CDH1 may refer to:
 Huntsville/Deerhurst Resort Airport
 CDH1 (gene), classical cadherin from the cadherin superfamily
 APC/C activator protein CDH1, cell-cycle regulated activator of the anaphase-promoting complex/cyclosome (APC/C)